The Salford City Reds played in Super League XVIII during the 2013 season. This was the 18th season of the Super League era.

Prior to the season the club looked to be folding until Marwan Koukash took over in January 2013.

Reds' first game of the 2013 Super League was a 0-42 home defeat by Wigan Warriors.

References

Salford Red Devils seasons
2013 in rugby league by club